The Jemba Inertia Notes System is a computer software program used in rallying that automatically prints out stage notes for competitors to use. The purpose of the system is to allow organizers to create a consistent set of pace notes for all the competitors without having them to take additional time and resources to do the reconnaissance themselves. Currently, the system is used most heavily in the Rally America National Championship but is also used greatly for national championships in Canada, Sweden, Norway, New Zealand, Great Britain and South Africa.

The system was developed by Jemba, a Swedish-based company that specializes in making and selling of a limited scope of rally-specific products. In addition to their inertia notes system, they are a distributor for Peltor helmets, and Coralba rally computers (odometer) on which the notes system runs.

Technical
The Jemba Inertia Notes System comes in the form of software loaded onto a laptop. The laptop is connected to an odometer and a series of accelerometers (hence “inertia”) inside a car. The odometer is used to calculate precise distances between instructions and to give the location of the instructions. The accelerometers sense turns, bumps, and hills in order to give consistent grading of corners and crests in the printout. The terminology used in the printout is then defined by the user of the system.

To use the system, the user connects the laptop to the odometer and accelerometers inside the car. The user then drives the stage, a competitive section in rallying, at normal speed in the middle of the road. By going much slower than competition speeds, the accelerometers are less prone to inaccuracies, and by driving in the middle of the road, a more accurate description of the road is given (that isn’t biased to one side or the other). Then, the system prints out a description of the road based on the user's pre-defined preferences and allows the user to then make any manual changes they feel are necessary.

Regional variation
In order to be usable across the world, the system takes into account regional variation. The printout can be changed to adapt to different languages, terminology, or preferences. On the company’s website, a comparison of the system used in New Zealand is shown to be very different from that of the United States by using a different scale and terminology.

American system

New Zealand system

While the US system goes from one to six, one being the slowest, six being the fastest, the New Zealand System goes from one to eight (eight being the fastest, one being the slowest). Also, the directional term (L for left, R for right) is shown in front of the numeric term in the American system and following the numeric term in the New Zealand system.

Extra features
In addition to a printout of the notes, one can also get a graphical plot of the stage, numeric information about the stage, and a graph showing the speed profile over the complete stage for a simulated run with a user-defined specification of a rally car that might be competing.

Margin for critical braking distance before stop.
This is how far competitive speed may be carried until braking to be able to stop at the stop control.

Use of available braking dist before stop (%)
This tells how many percent of the available braking will have to be used under maximum braking.

Jemba Safety Index (J/kg)
Jemba Safety Index gives average kinetic energy in the car through corners, that is the average energy available to cause damage on places where the car slides.

Problems
While relatively consistent and accurate, the system is still prone to some small inaccuracies. Given the same road driven twice with the system, slight variations in printouts can occur. Also, the system cannot anticipate landmarks, hazards, or tricky/deceptive areas along the route. This is decided by the person making the notes for the rally and is inserted manually. Because of these slight inaccuracies and the danger associated with driving at high speeds on roads never seen by the competitors, a one-pass reconnaissance, also known as a notes familiarization pass, NFP, or recce, is incorporated into some rallies to allow competitors to make their own alterations to the notes while still cutting back on the time and resources needed for a full reconnaissance.

References

External links
Jemba Sweden
P-Sport Stage Note Preparation Service (US)
How are Jemba notes made?
Observations from a first time drive on stage notes
Graphical representation of corner grades (US)

Rally racing
Sports software